The 2021 UEFA Nations League Finals was the final tournament of the 2020–21 edition of the UEFA Nations League, the second season of the international football competition involving the men's national teams of the 55 member associations of UEFA. The tournament was held in Italy from 6 to 10 October 2021, and was contested by the four group winners of Nations League A. The tournament consisted of two semi-finals, a third place play-off and final to determine the champions of the UEFA Nations League.

Portugal were the defending champions, having won the inaugural 2019 finals. However, they failed to qualify for the 2021 finals after finishing second in their group behind France.

France won the final 2–1 against Spain for their first UEFA Nations League title.

Format
The Nations League Finals took place in October 2021 and were contested by the four group winners of League A. The four teams were each drawn into a five-team group (rather than a six-team group) for the 2022 FIFA World Cup qualification group stage, thereby leaving the October 2021 window available for the Nations League Finals.

The Nations League Finals were played in single-leg knockout matches, consisting of two semi-finals, a third place play-off and a final. The semi-final pairings were determined by means of an open draw. All matches in the tournament utilised the goal-line technology and video assistant referee (VAR) systems.

In the Nations League Finals, if the scores were level at the end of normal time:
In the semi-finals and final, 30 minutes of extra time would be played. If the score was still level after extra time, the winner would be determined by a penalty shoot-out.
In the third place play-off, extra time would not be played, and the winner would be determined by a penalty shoot-out (this was a change from the 2019 finals, which utilized extra time in the third place play-off).

On 31 March 2021, the UEFA Executive Committee approved the use of a maximum of five substitutions in matches at the Nations League Finals (with a sixth allowed in extra time). However, each team was only given three opportunities to make substitutions, with a fourth opportunity allowed in extra time, excluding substitutions made at half-time, before the start of extra time and at half-time in extra time. The use of five substitutes had been permitted by IFAB during the COVID-19 pandemic due to the resulting fixture congestion, which created a greater burden on players.

Qualified teams
The four group winners of League A qualified for the Nations League Finals.

Schedule
The Nations League Finals, originally scheduled for 2–6 June 2021, were moved to 6–10 October 2021 following the rescheduling of UEFA Euro 2020 to June and July 2021 due to the COVID-19 pandemic. The tournament took place over five days, with the semi-finals on 6 and 7 October (the first of which featured the host team), and the third place play-off and final three days after the second semi-final on 10 October 2021.

Host selection
Italy was confirmed as the host country by the UEFA Executive Committee during their meeting on 3 December 2020. Only League A teams could bid for the Nations League Finals, and only one of the four participants is selected as hosts. The Nations League Finals were held in two stadiums, each with a seating capacity of at least 30,000.

On 24 September 2020, UEFA announced that Italy, the Netherlands, and Poland had declared interest in hosting the tournament, all three of which are members of Group A1. Italy were confirmed as winners of Group A1 over the Netherlands and Poland on 18 November 2020, thereby confirming hosting rights, which were confirmed by the UEFA Executive Committee on 3 December 2020, the same day as the Nations League Finals draw. If the fourth member of the group, Bosnia and Herzegovina, had qualified for the Nations League Finals, the UEFA Executive Committee would have decided the venues.

Bidding venues

San Siro, Milan
Juventus Stadium, Turin

Johan Cruyff Arena, Amsterdam
De Kuip, Rotterdam

Stadion Narodowy, Warsaw
Stadion Wojska Polskiego, Warsaw (potential second venue)
Stadion Śląski, Chorzów (potential second venue)
Stadion Miejski im. Henryka Reymana, Kraków (potential second venue)

Venues
In their bid dossier, the Italian Football Federation proposed the San Siro in Milan and Juventus Stadium in Turin as the venues.

Draw
The semi-final pairings were determined by means of an open draw on 3 December 2020, 17:30 CET, at the UEFA headquarters in Nyon, Switzerland. The first two teams drawn were allocated to match pairing A, while the remaining two teams drawn were allocated to match pairing B. For scheduling purposes, the host team was allocated to the first semi-final as the administrative home team. The administrative home team for both the third place play-off and final were predetermined as the teams which advanced from semi-final 1.

Squads

Each national team had to submit a squad of 23 players, three of whom had to be goalkeepers, at least ten days before the opening match of the tournament. If a player became injured or ill severely enough to prevent his participation in the tournament before his team's first match, he was replaced by another player.

Bracket

All times are local, CEST (UTC+2).

Semi-finals

Italy vs Spain

Belgium vs France

Third place play-off

Final

Statistics

Goalscorers

Awards
Player of the Tournament

The Hisense Player of the Finals award was given to Sergio Busquets, who was chosen by UEFA's technical observers.
 Sergio Busquets

Top Scorer

The "Alipay Top Scorer Trophy", given to the top scorer in the Nations League Finals, was awarded to Kylian Mbappé, who finished with two goals and two assists in the Nations League Finals. The ranking was determined using the following criteria: 1) goals in Nations League Finals, 2) assists in Nations League Finals, 3) fewest minutes played in Nations League Finals, 4) goals in league phase.

Goal of the Tournament

The Gazprom Goal of the Tournament was decided by online voting. A total four goals were in the shortlist, chosen by UEFA's technical observers: Karim Benzema (against Spain), Ferran Torres (second goal against Italy), Theo Hernandez (against Belgium) and Romelu Lukaku (against France). Benzema won the award for his goal in the final.

Discipline
A player was automatically suspended for the next match for receiving a red card, which could be extended for serious offences. Yellow card suspensions did not apply in the Nations League Finals.

The following suspensions were served during the tournament:

References

External links

UEFA Technical Report

 
Finals
2021
2021–22 in Italian football
International association football competitions hosted by Italy
October 2021 sports events in Italy
2021–22 in Belgian football
2021–22 in French football
2021–22 in Spanish football
2021 UEFA Nations League Finals
Sports competitions in Milan
Football in Milan
2021 UEFA Nations League Finals
Sports competitions in Turin
Football in Turin